Bruce Howard Kulick (born December 12, 1953) is an American guitarist and since 2000 a member of the rock band Grand Funk Railroad. Previously, Kulick was a member of the band Kiss (19841996). He was also a member of Union with John Corabi from 19972002 and Blackjack from 19791980.

Kulick has also released several solo albums, in addition to session work with various artists. He is the younger brother of guitarist Bob Kulick.

Early life and family 
Kulick was born in Brooklyn, New York City and lived in Queens for a time, graduating from Newtown High School. He is Jewish and also went to Hebrew school.

Kulick's brother, session guitarist/producer Bob Kulick, was influential in his music career. Bob's performance credits include W.A.S.P., Meat Loaf's touring band, and Kiss.

Career

Early projects 
Bruce's first band KKB, was formed in 1974. Its other members were his childhood friends Mike Katz and Guy Bois (the other K and B of KKB, respectively) and Kulick likened its sound to that of Cream. Kulick found the master tape from those sessions in 2008 and issued it via limited edition CD, available during his appearances at Kiss expos and via his website. In an interview from 2008, Kulick also discussed his lifelong love of Star Wars and its historical similarities to Kiss.

He first began touring professionally with George McCrae and Andrea True.

Meat Loaf 

In 1977, following the release of Meat Loaf's first album Bat Out of Hell, Kulick played rhythm guitar/lead guitar on tour with Meat Loaf's band alongside his brother Bob on lead guitar/rhythm guitar. The success of the year-long tour took the Kulick brothers around the world.  In addition to the success of the tour, many famous television appearances were done, such as Saturday Night Live and The Old Grey Whistle Test.

Blackjack 
Kulick was a member of the band Blackjack, with Michael Bolton, during the band's short existence from 1979 to 1980. He also played on several Bolton solo albums. (Bolton later co-wrote the Kiss song "Forever", from Hot in the Shade).

"Stay", a Blackjack song co-written by Kulick and Bolton, was sampled by rapper Jay-Z for the song "A Dream" off his 2002 album The Blueprint 2: The Gift & the Curse which reached #1 on the Billboard charts.

The Good Rats 
Kulick joined the Long Island-based band the Good Rats in 1981, and is on their album, Great American Music.

Michael Bolton 
In 1983, Bruce was asked to join Michael Bolton as his guitarist for his debut album release tour, after Bolton anglicizing his family name from Bolotin.

Kiss (1984–1996) 
Kulick joined the rock band Kiss in September 1984 as the lead guitarist, replacing Mark St. John, who left the band after being diagnosed with reactive arthritis. Kulick never wore onstage makeup, since the band had stopped wearing it in 1983. Kulick and St. John are the only two members of Kiss never to have worn makeup in the band. He stayed with Kiss until 1996.

Kulick played on five Kiss studio albums: Asylum (1985), Crazy Nights (1987), Hot in the Shade (1989), Revenge (1992) and Carnival of Souls: The Final Sessions (1997); he also appeared on Alive III and MTV Unplugged. The song "I Walk Alone", from Carnival of Souls: The Final Sessions, is the only Kiss track to feature Kulick as lead vocalist. To this day, Kulick is featured on more than twenty Kiss releases.

When the original members of the band regrouped, starting in 1995 with the MTV Unplugged special that carried over into re-adopting their make-up and costuming for the Alive/Worldwide Tour in 1996, Kulick and Eric Singer were paid weekly during the tour; while "sidelined" from Kiss, both were allowed to do other projects as long as Simmons and Stanley okayed them. Kulick officially left Kiss in December 1996. When Ace Frehley again left Kiss (in 2002, after the Kiss Farewell Tour), Kulick was not asked to rejoin, as Simmons and Stanley thought that Tommy Thayer (former Black 'n Blue guitarist and Kiss tour manager) could capture/copy Frehley's persona better than Kulick; however, Kulick continued to work with Kiss after his departure, contributing work to the Psycho Circus album.  Kulick briefly rejoined the band on Kiss Kruise 2021 and played on 2 songs,  Tears Are Falling and Heaven's on Fire.

Union 
Soon after leaving Kiss, Kulick formed the band Union with John Corabi, Brent Fitz, and Jamie Hunting in 1996. Corabi and Kulick wrote what would become the first album, the self-titled Union,  which was released in 1998. They proceeded with a nationwide acoustic tour to promote the album, featuring just Corabi and Kulick (both on guitar). Soon the full band went on a world tour headlining small venues in support of the album. Their second album 1999's Live in the Galaxy, was a live recording with two acoustic tracks recorded in a mobile studio. The third Union album was The Blue Room (2000).

Grand Funk Railroad 

Kulick is the lead guitarist for Grand Funk Railroad, with whom he has been playing since 2000. Kulick had originally met Grand Funk Railroad drummer Don Brewer when Brewer was performing with Bob Seger during the 1983 tour with Michael Bolton.

Solo work 
Kulick has released three solo albums: Audiodog in 2001, Transformer in 2003, and most recently BK3, which was released on February 2, 2010.

Other work 

Kulick earned a writing credit on the song "Never Let Me Down" on the 2004 Kanye West album, The College Dropout.

Kulick has also appeared on all album releases by Eric Singer's solo project ESP (Eric Singer Project): Lost and Spaced (1998), ESP (1999), and Eric Singer Project: Live in Tokyo (2006).  Kulick also appeared on the DVD Eric Singer Project: Live at the Marquee (2006), which was filmed live in Australia.

Kulick appears on the Lordi March 2006 album The Arockalypse, playing lead guitar on the song "It Snows in Hell".

Kulick appears on Paul Stanley's 2006 album Live to Win, playing bass.

Kulick cut a guest guitar solo for the track "The Edge of the Razor" (featured on the album Emotional Coma) by Swedish metal group Lion's Share.

Personal life 
Bruce is currently married to Lisa Lane Kulick. They met in 2008, and were married in 2014. They often perform together at events and online.

Discography

with Mike Katz, Guy Bois 
KKB 1974 (2008)
Got to Get Back (2015)

Rosetta 
 Where's My Hero (1980)

with Billy Squier 
The Tale of the Tape (1980)

with Blackjack 
Blackjack (1979)
Worlds Apart (1980)

with The Good Rats 
Great American Music (1981)
Tasty Seconds (1996)

with Michael Bolton 
Michael Bolton (1983)
Everybody's Crazy (1985)
The Hunger (1987)

with Kiss 
Animalize (lead guitar on "Lonely Is the Hunter" & "Murder in High Heels") (1984)
Asylum (1985)
Crazy Nights (1987)
Smashes, Thrashes & Hits (1988)
Hot in the Shade (1989)
Revenge (1992)
Alive III (1993)
MTV Unplugged (1996)
Carnival of Souls: The Final Sessions (1997)
Psycho Circus Bass on ("Psycho Circus" title track) backwards guitar intro and solo (on "Within"), rhythm and bass guitar (on "Dreamin'") (1998)
Music From the Motion Picture "Detroit Rock City" (bass on "Nothing Can Keep Me From You") (1999)
The Box Set (2001)

Kiss Video albums 
Animalize Live Uncensored (1985)
Exposed (1987)
Crazy Nights (1988)
X-treme Close-Up (1992)
Kiss Konfidential (1993)
Kiss My Ass: The Video (1994)
Kiss Unplugged (1996)
Kissology Volume Two: 1978–1991 (2007)
Kissology Volume Three: 1992–2000 (2007)

with Union 
Union (1998)
Live in the Galaxy (1999)
The Blue Room (2000)

with ESP 
Lost & Spaced (1998)
ESP (1999)
Live in Japan (2006)
Live at the Marquee DVD (2006)

Solo 
Audiodog (2001)
Transformer (2003)
BK3 (2010)

Other work 
Michael Wendroff – Kiss the World Goodbye (1978)
Stevie – Gypsy! (1984)
Ronnie Spector – Unfinished Business (1987)
Don Johnson – Let It Roll (1989)
Skull – No Bones About It (1991)
Guitar's Practicing Musicians – Vol. II (1991)
Blackthorne – Afterlife (1993)
Tribute to Queen – Dragon Attack (1997) Lead guitar on "Save Me"
Mark Mangold – Mystic Healer (1998)
Graham Bonnet – The Day I Went Mad (1999)
Shameless – Backstreet Anthems (1999)
Boot Camp – As You Were (1999)
Shameless – Queen 4 a Day (2000)
Tribute to Van Halen – Little Guitars (2000) Produced by Bob Kulick.
Ozzy Osbourne Tribute – A Tribute to Ozzy: Bat Head Soup (2000)
Bret Michaels – A Salute to Poison (American band): Show Me Your Hits (2000)
Eric Carr – Rockology (2000) Produced by Bruce Kulick.
A Tribute to Metallica – Metallic Assault (2001)
Meat Loaf – Bat Out of Hell (re-issue; 2001) guitar on bonus live tracks.
Pink Floyd Tribute – An All-Star Lineup Performing the Songs of Pink Floyd (2002)
Todd Rundgren – Re-Mixes (2003)
Kiss Tribute – Spin The Bottle (2004)
Chris Catena – Freak Out (2004)
Gene Simmons – Asshole (2004)
Bruce and Bob Kulick – KISS Forever (2005) KISS Instructional DVD
Tribute to Iron Maiden – Numbers from the Beast (2005) Guitar on Can I Play With Madness.
Lordi – The Arockalypse (2006)
Paul Stanley – Live to Win (2006)
Michael Schenker – Doctor Doctor: The Kulick Sessions (2008)
Led Box – The Ultimate Led Zeppelin Tribute: Dazed & Confused (2008)
We Wish You a Metal Xmas and a Headbanging New Year (2008)
Balance – Equilibrium (2009)
Chris Catena – 'Discovery (2009)
Lordi – Babez for Breakfast (2010)
Avantasia – The Wicked Symphony (2010)
Avantasia – Angel of Babylon (2010)
Eric Carr – Unfinished Business (2011)
Avantasia – The Mystery of Time (2013)
Michael Jackson Tribute – Thriller: A Metal Tribute to Michael Jackson (2013)
Tomas Bergsten's Fantasy – Caught in the Dark (2013)
H. P. Lovecraft Historical Society – Dreams in the Witch House – A Lovecraftian Rock Opera (2013)
Mocassin Creek – Friends of All Kinds (2013)
DJ Peace – Do You Love Me? (Tribute to KISS) (2014)
Randy Rhoads Tribute – Immortal Randy Rhoads: The Ultimate Tribute (2015)
Paco Ventura  - Black Moon (2015) Guest on En tu piel
Lita Ford – "Time Capsule"- "Rotten to the Core" (2016)
 Avantasia – Ghostlights (2016)
ColdTears – "Silence Them All (2018) Lead guitar on "Miracle"
Ace Frehley – Origins Vol. 2 – lead guitar on "Manic Depression" (2020)

References

Bibliography

External links 

See photos of Bruce live with Union and ESP
Bruce Kulick BK3 interview & more 2009
Bruce Kulick Kiss Song Guitar Lessons
Career Retrospective Interview from July 2015 with Pods & Sods

Interviews 
Bruce Kulick Interview with Guitarhoo! 2008.
Bruce Kulick Interview at Confessions of a Pop Culture Addict
Bruce Kulick Interview with Australian Rock Show Podcast 2017

Living people
Musicians from Brooklyn
American people of Russian-Jewish descent
Eric Singer Project members
Union (band) members
American heavy metal guitarists
American rock guitarists
Jewish rock musicians
American male guitarists
Neverland Express members
Grand Funk Railroad members
Jewish heavy metal musicians
Kiss (band) members
Lead guitarists
Guitarists from New York (state)
20th-century American guitarists
1953 births